The Drikungpa, or more formally the Drikung Kyabgön, is the head of the Drikung Kagyu, a sub-school of the Kagyu (བཀའ་བརྒྱུད), itself one of the four major schools of Tibetan Buddhism.

Like all other Kagyu lineages, origins of Drikung Kagyu can be traced back to the Great Indian Master Tilopa who passed on his teachings to Mahasiddha Naropa who lived around 10th and 11th century. The founder of  the Drikung Kagyu lineage was Jigten Sumgön (1143-1217) of the Kyura clan, who was the disciple of Phagmo Drupa. According to historical account from the time, Jigten Sumgön's teachings attracted more than 100,000 people at a time, with the highest number of attendance recorded at 130,000.

From the founding of Drikung Thil Monastery in 1179 to the present day, the Drikung Kagyu lineage has been led by a succession of spiritual heads ("throne-holders"). One of the two current heads of the lineage, Drikung Kyabgön Chetsang Rinpoche, Könchok Tenzin Kunzang Thinley Lhundrup (b. 1946), the 37th Drikungpa resides at Drikung Kagyu Institute at Dehra Dun, India. The other head of the Drikung Kagyu Lineage, the 36th Drikungpa, Drikung Kyabgön Chungtsang Rinpoche, Könchok Tenzin Chökyi Nangwa (b. 1942) lives in Lhasa, Tibet.

Lineage timeline
According to The Great Kagyu Masters, the lineage succession is as follows:

See also
Karmapa
Shamarpa

Notes

Citations

References

 
 

 
 
 

 
Drikung Kagyu tulkus
Tibetan Buddhist titles
Tulkus